Kavisha K Egodage (born 23 April 2003) is a women's cricketer who plays for the United Arab Emirates national cricket team. She is a right-hand batswomen who bowls right-arm off spin for the national team. In July 2018, she was named in the United Arab Emirates' squad for the 2018 ICC Women's World Twenty20 Qualifier tournament. At the age of 11, Kavisha became one of the youngest cricketers to be selected for the UAE women's team that participated in the Gulf Cup T20 Women's Championship held in Oman in 2014. She made her WT20I debut against Netherlands on 7 July 2018.

She scored her maiden international half century against Malaysia 57* in the Thailand T20 Smash at the age of 15. She holds the record for the youngest player to score an International Fifty  She was named as the Best Female Cricketer of the year in the 2019 Shyam Bhatia Award. She is the highest run scorer for the year 2022 in Women's T20I.

In October 2022, she played for UAE in Women's Twenty20 Asia Cup.

References

Further reading

External links
 

2003 births
Living people
Sportspeople from Dubai
Emirati women cricketers
United Arab Emirates women Twenty20 International cricketers
Sri Lankan expatriate sportspeople in the United Arab Emirates